Emmanuel College may refer to one of several academic institutions:

Australia
 Emmanuel College, University of Queensland, in St Lucia, Brisbane
 Emmanuel College, Gold Coast, a multi-denominational Christian school in Carrara
 Emmanuel College, Melbourne, a Roman Catholic secondary school with two campuses
 Emmanuel College, Warrnambool, a Roman Catholic secondary school with three campuses

Canada
 Emmanuel College, Toronto, part of Victoria University in the University of Toronto
 Emmanuel Bible College, a religious college in Kitchener, Ontario

England
 Emmanuel College, Cambridge, a constituent college of the University of Cambridge
 Emmanuel College, Gateshead, formerly Emmanuel City Technology College

United States
 Emmanuel College (Georgia), a liberal arts college in Franklin Springs, Georgia
 Emmanuel College (Massachusetts), a liberal arts college in Boston, Massachusetts

See also
Immanuel College (disambiguation)